The women's high jump event at the 1994 World Junior Championships in Athletics was held in Lisbon, Portugal, at Estádio Universitário de Lisboa on 21 and 23 July.

Medalists

Results

Final
23 July

Qualifications
21 Jul

Group A

Group B

Participation
According to an unofficial count, 21 athletes from 15 countries participated in the event.

References

High jump
High jump at the World Athletics U20 Championships